Xylophanes nabuchodonosor is a moth of the  family Sphingidae.

Distribution 
It is known from Bolivia and Peru.

Description 
The wingspan is 76–82 mm.

References

nabuchodonosor
Moths described in 1904